Jon Echols (born December 3, 1979) is an American politician who has served in the Oklahoma House of Representatives from the 90th district since 2012.

References

1979 births
21st-century American politicians
Living people
Republican Party members of the Oklahoma House of Representatives